Konstantin Kalistratov (born 14 August 1967) is a Soviet speed skater. He competed in the men's 1500 metres event at the 1992 Winter Olympics.

References

1967 births
Living people
Soviet male speed skaters
Olympic speed skaters of the Unified Team
Speed skaters at the 1992 Winter Olympics
People from Osh